Chanceford is an 18th-century building in Maryland located at 209, West Federal Street, Snow Hill, Worcester County, Maryland. It is an early example of a neo-classical temple-fronted dwelling on the Eastern Shore of Maryland.

Built in 1792–93, Chanceford is a stuccoed brick house with a transverse hall.  A single-story hyphen to the rear connects the main house to the two-story kitchen wing.  The interior retains much of its original woodwork.

It was listed on the National Register of Historic Places in 1994. It is operated as bed and breakfast accommodation.

References

External links
, including photo from 1988, at Maryland Historical Trust

Houses on the National Register of Historic Places in Maryland
Houses in Worcester County, Maryland
Federal architecture in Maryland
Houses completed in 1792
National Register of Historic Places in Worcester County, Maryland